Østernvann is a lake north of Fossum in the municipality of Bærum in Akershus county, Norway.

See also
List of lakes in Norway

Lakes of Viken (county)